2′-Acetoxycocaine (ortho-acetoxy-cocaine) is a cocaine analog, with a quicker effect onset than cocaine. The acetoxy branch renders the molecule a QSAR of a 4-fold increase over cocaine in its binding potency for the dopamine transporter & a 35-fold enhanced affinity for the norepinephrine transporter. It also has a reduced selectivity for the serotonin transporter (though only due to its greater increase at NET & DAT binding being of such an order of magnitude more by comparison). In overall binding affinity (not uptake inhibition) it displaces ligands better across the board than cocaine in all monoamine categories. Salicylmethylecgonine would be an intermediate metabolite in vivo in humans (therefore affecting the overall effect profile of the administered 2′-acetoxy analog via its metabolic route; giving it nearly three times the affinity for DAT, after onset, and greaten the affinity that is would have for NET by a halve more than on upon initial exposure, after rapid deacetylation.) 2′-Acetoxycocaine has a closer to optimum LogP (a square value of 2) for blood–brain barrier penetration (cocaine being higher and logarithmically four times the optimal lipophilicity allowing too much of the compound to be dumped out directly into fatty tissue instead of reaching its target site) this would make it a prodrug to salicylmethylecgonine due to the latter having a less (and the ortho-acetoxy analog having a more) efficacious LogP than its cocaine parent.

ɑPredictive algorithm used is dynamic and subject to change as database expands, should be taken as suggestive values, and only putative/uncertain as exact quantitative value is concerned.

References

Tropanes
Dopamine reuptake inhibitors
Stimulants
Local anesthetics
Methyl esters